A list of films produced in France in 1980.

Notes

External links
 1980 in France
 1980 in French television
 French films of 1980 at the Internet Movie Database
French films of 1980 at Cinema-francais.fr

1980
Films
French